Richard Cole (1946–2021) is a British tour manager and author.

Richard Cole or Dick Cole may also refer to:

Richard Cole
 Richard Cole (died 1614) (1568–1614), member of the Devonshire gentry
 Richard Cole (politician) (1671–1729), Irish House of Commons
 R. Beverly Cole (1829–1901), American physician
 Richard E. Cole (1915–2019), U.S. Air Force lieutenant colonel
 Richie Cole (musician) (1948–2020), American jazz saxophonist
 Richard T. Cole (born 1948), professor at Michigan State University
 Richard J. Cole (born 1957), professor of computer science at New York University
 Richie Cole (footballer) (born 1983), Australian rules footballer
 Richard Cole (EastEnders), fictional character from British soap opera EastEnders

Dick Cole
 Dick Cole (baseball) (1926–2018), American Major League shortstop
 Dick Cole (politician) (born 1968), Cornish councillor
 Dick Cole, the protagonist of The Adventures of Dick Cole

See also 
 Richard Coles (born 1962), journalist, musician, and Church of England vicar
 Richard Coles (civil servant) (1862–1935), British civil servant